Yeon Taejo (?-616?) (연태조, 淵太祚) was the Magniji (Prime Minister) of Goguryeo during the reigns of King Pyeongwon and King Yeongyang. He was the father of Yeon Gaesomun, and was known to have taken an aggressive stance against the Sui Dynasty alongside Field Marshal Eulji Mundeok.

Background 
Yeon Taejo was the son of the previous Magniji Yeon Ja-yu, and father of Yeon Gaesomun, Yeon Jeongto, and their only known sister. During his lifetime, he was the Daedaero of the Western province of Goguryeo  and was also the Magniji of Goguryeo after the death of his father.

Goguryeo-Sui Wars 
After the victories of Goguryeo over the Sui Dynasty, infighting occurred within the Goguryeo Court. The North faction, which was highly against the Sui, and the South faction, which favored peace with the Sui, fell into dispute over whether or not Goguryeo should take advantage of the Sui's preoccupation with the rebellion of Yang Xuangan. The North faction consisted of Yeon Taejo, Eulji Mundeok and the military officials, while the South faction consisted of Grand Prince Go Geon-Mu, and the scholar-officials. The South faction rose victorious, and Yeon Taejo attempted to pass his positions on to his eldest son Yeon Gaesomun, but was stopped by the other Daedaeros' protests. This resulted in Yeon Taejo's death without seeing a proper successor to his positions.

Legacy 
Yeon Taejo's position of Magniji was given to Eulji Mundeok, and eventually to Yeon Gaesomun. The position of Daedaero of the Eastern province was also given to his eldest son. Yeon Gaesomun later led a coup that overthrew Go Geon-mu, who had become the 27th Taewang of Goguryeo. Yeon Gaesomun led Goguryeo through one last period of glory before its fall in 668 at the hands of the Tang-Silla Alliance.

See also
 Three Kingdoms of Korea
 Goguryeo
 Goguryeo-Sui Wars
 Yeon Gaesomun

History of Korea
Goguryeo people
7th-century heads of government